

Portugal
 Angola – 
 Carlos Augusto Franco, Governor-General of Angola (1860–1861)
 Sebastião Lopes de Calheiros e Meneses, Governor-General of Angola (1861–1862)

United Kingdom
Malta Colony – John Le Marchant, Governor of Malta (1858–1864)
New South Wales 
 Sir William Denison, Governor of New South Wales (1855–1861)
 John Young, Baron Lisgar, Governor of New South Wales (1861–1867)
 Queensland – Sir George Bowen, Governor of Queensland (1859–1868)
 Tasmania – Sir Henry Young, Governor of Tasmania (1855–1861)
 South Australia – Sir Richard Graves MacDonnell, Governor of South Australia (1855–1862)
 Victoria – Sir Henry Barkly, Governor of Victoria (1856–1863)
 Western Australia – Sir Arthur Kennedy, Governor of Western Australia (1855–1862)

Colonial governors
Colonial governors
1861